Lerab Ling is a Tibetan Buddhist centre founded in 1992 by Sogyal Rinpoche in Roqueredonde, near Lodève in Occitanie, France. It contains perhaps the largest Tibetan Buddhist temple in Europe, which was officially inaugurated by the Dalai Lama in 2008 at a ceremony attended by Carla Bruni-Sarkozy.

History
Before it became a buddhist retreat centre, the land was known as L'Engayresque, which means 'the place of springs' in the ancient Occitan language. The site was chosen by Dilgo Khyentse Rinpoche in 1990, and was then blessed by Dodrupchen Rinpoche in 1991. It has hosted Rigpa's annual summer retreats since 1992. Since then it has been visited by many of the highest ranking lamas of all Tibetan Buddhist schools, including the Dalai Lama who visited both in 2000 and 2008, and Sakya Trizin in 2007. From 2006 until 2009 a traditional three-year retreat took place with over 300 participants.

Temple
The three-storey temple at Lerab Ling with its distinctive copper roofs is based on traditional Tibetan architecture. Its centrepiece is a  statue of Buddha Shakyamuni crafted in Burma. It also includes 1000 bronze buddha statues representing the 1000 buddhas of this kalpa (aeon). There is a statue of Padmasambhava in the lake to the north-east of the main temple.

Monastic community
Ordained monks and nuns living in Lerab Ling have been formally recognized as a religious congregation under French law.

Tourism and Visits
In one of the most beautiful and natural environments northwest of Montpellier in France, you can find a magnificent temple, which is at the heart of the Tibetan Buddhist Retreat Centre, Lerab Ling. In all aspects, the temple is inspired by the art and architecture of ancient Tibetan Buddhist monasteries in the Himalayas. Inside the temple is a  statue of the Buddha as well as many authentic paintings and statues.

To respect and maintain the atmosphere of meditation and retreat, Lerab Ling is only open to the public:

 On Sunday afternoons only from 2pm to 5pm for visits from April to 4 November. Outside these periods Lerab Ling is closed.
 Upon request only (at least 14 days ahead) and during certain periods (from Tuesday to Saturday), it is possible to visit Lerab Ling in groups. It is also possible for the group to book a meal and join the community for lunch.

Thanks to always check the times and dates of the visits on lerabling.org

Gallery

References

External links
Official website
Video of the inauguration of the temple in 2008

Tibetan Buddhism in France
Nyingma monasteries and temples
Buddhist temples in France
Buildings and structures in Hérault
Tourist attractions in Hérault